Timothy Gordan Tyrrell (born February 19, 1961) is a former professional American football running back who played in the National Football League (NFL) for six seasons, with the Atlanta Falcons (1984–1986), the Los Angeles Rams (1986–1988), and the Pittsburgh Steelers (1989).

References

External links
 

1961 births
Living people
American football running backs
Atlanta Falcons players
Los Angeles Rams players
Northern Illinois Huskies football players
Pittsburgh Steelers players
James B. Conant High School alumni
People from Hoffman Estates, Illinois
Players of American football from Chicago